Septin-11 is a protein that in humans is encoded by the SEPT11 gene.

References

Further reading